Gymnasura saginaea is a moth of the subfamily Arctiinae. It was described by Turner in 1899. It is found in Queensland, Australia.

Adults are pale yellow, with a network of dark lines across the forewings.

References

Nudariina
Moths described in 1899
Moths of Australia